Line S 68 is an S-Bahn line on the Rhine-Ruhr network. It is operated by DB Regio. It was established on 13 December 2009. It is operated using a double set of class 420.

Line S 68 runs:
from Wuppertal-Vohwinkel to Düsseldorf over the Düsseldorf–Elberfeld railway opened by the Düsseldorf-Elberfeld Railway Company between 1838 and 1841,
 from Düsseldorf to Langenfeld over the Cologne–Duisburg railway, opened by the Cologne-Minden Railway Company in 1845.

References

 
Rhine-Ruhr S-Bahn
2009 establishments in Germany